Cerioheterastraea is an extinct genus of prehistoric stony corals in the extinct family Stylophyllidae. Species are from the Trias of China and the Russian Federation.

See also 
 List of prehistoric hexacoral genera

References 

Prehistoric Hexacorallia genera
Scleractinia genera
Triassic invertebrates
Triassic animals of Asia